Valiyavallampathy is a village in the Palakkad district, state of Kerala, India. It forms a part of the area administered by the Kozhinjampara gram panchayat.

Demographics
 India census, Valiyavallampathy had a population of 13,141 with 6,535 males and 6,606 females.

References

Valiyavallampathy